Klaus Dieter Ploghaus (31 January 1956 – 11 January 2022) was a West German hammer thrower. He was born in Gelnhausen, Hesse.

His biggest success came at the 1984 Summer Olympics held in Los Angeles, United States where he won the bronze medal. In addition he finished twelfth at the 1978 European Championships, eighth at the 1982 European Championships, sixth at the 1983 World Championships and ninth at the 1986 European Championships.

His personal best throw was 81.32 metres, achieved in May 1986 in Paderborn. This ranks him seventh among German hammer throwers, behind Ralf Haber, Heinz Weis, Karsten Kobs, Günther Rodehau, Holger Klose and Christoph Sahner.

Ploghaus died on 11 January 2022, at the age of 65.

References

External links
 
 
 

1956 births
2022 deaths
People from Gelnhausen
Sportspeople from Darmstadt (region)
German male hammer throwers
West German male hammer throwers
Olympic athletes of West Germany
Olympic bronze medalists for West Germany
Athletes (track and field) at the 1984 Summer Olympics
World Athletics Championships athletes for West Germany
Medalists at the 1984 Summer Olympics
Olympic bronze medalists in athletics (track and field)
Universiade medalists in athletics (track and field)
Universiade gold medalists for West Germany
Medalists at the 1979 Summer Universiade
Medalists at the 1981 Summer Universiade